State Route 270 is a short north–south thoroughfare that sits completely within Salt Lake City in Salt Lake County, entirely along South West Temple Street. The southern terminus is at West 900 South, with ramps to and from I-15/I-80 at exit 305D; its northern terminus is at US-89 (West 400 South, formerly SR-186).

Route description

After its southern terminus, SR-270 heads north for its entire course, having a dual intersection with SR-269, one eastbound and one westbound. Afterwards it terminates at US-89.

History

The State Road Commission (now known as the Utah Department of Transportation) designated SR-270 in 1960 as a branch from proposed I-15 to former SR-176 (West 900 South) at South West Temple Street. In 1969, the state legislature extended it north to SR-186 (West 400 South, now US-89).

Major intersections

References

270
 270
 270
Streets in Utah